Barbodes bovanicus, the Bowany barb,  is a species of cyprinid fish native to the Cauvery River system in India where it is an inhabitant of reservoirs.  This species can reach a length of  TL.

Etymology
The specific epithet is derived from the Bhavani River.

References

Barbodes
Fish described in 1877
Taxobox binomials not recognized by IUCN